Abdulla agha Bakikhanov was a Azerbaijani military person, major general of the Imperial Russian Army, brother (by father) of the famous Azerbaijani writer and educator Abbasgulu Bakikhanov.

Life 
Abdulla agha Bakikhanov was born in 1824 in the family of the 3rd Baku Khan Mirza Muhammad Khan II. He served in the cavalry division of the Caucasian army and became an officer from 1843. In 1859 he was promoted to colonel, and on January 1, 1871 to major general. Participated in campaigns in the Caucasian War and Russo-Turkish War (1877–1878)
. In the 50-70s of the XIX century, he lived in the city of Quba in his hereditary possessions, was one of the large landowners of the Quba district, was engaged in educational activities among his peasants. He helped Hasan bey Zardabi distribute the newspaper Akinchi, the first newspaper in the Azerbaijani language.

Bakikhanov was at the disposal of the commander-in-chief of the Caucasian army until May 1876. On July 20, 1879, Major General Abdulla agha Bakikhanov died in Tiflis. On July 24, friends of the deceased asked to allow the removal of his body from a Muslim Shiite mosque to a Muslim cemetery.

Awards 
  - 3rd Class Order of Saint Anne.
  - 2nd Class Order of Saint Stanislaus with swords for muslims set.
  - 2nd Class Order of Saint Anne.
  - 4th Class Order of Saint Vladimir with swords for muslims set.

Notes

See also 
 Bakikhanovs

References

Sources
 

1824 births
1879 deaths
People from the Russian Empire
Military personnel of the Russian Empire
19th-century Azerbaijani people
Azerbaijani nobility
Imperial Russian Army generals
Azerbaijani generals of Imperial Russian Army
Recipients of the Order of Saint Stanislaus (Russian), 2nd class
Recipients of the Order of St. Anna, 3rd class
Recipients of the Order of St. Anna, 2nd class
Recipients of the Order of St. Vladimir, 4th class